Eorhynia is a genus of extinct plants of the Late Silurian (around ) which somewhat resemble Rhynia. Fossils were found in Podolia in modern Ukraine.

References

Silurian life
Prehistoric plant genera